Walther is a masculine given name and a surname. It is a German form of Walter, which is derived from the Old High German Walthari, containing the elements wald -"power", "brightness" or "forest" and hari -"warrior".

The name was first popularized by the famous epic German hero Walther von Aquitaine and later with the Minnesänger Walther von der Vogelweide.

Given name
 Walther Bauersfeld (1879–1959), German engineer who built the first projection planetarium
 Walther Bothe (1891–1957), German nuclear physicist and Nobel laureate
 Walther von Brauchitsch (1881–1948), German World War II field marshal
 Walther Dahl (1916–1985), German World War II flying ace
 Walther von Dyck (1856–1934), German mathematician
 Walther Flemming (1843–1905), German biologist and a founder of cytogenetics
 Walther Funk (1890–1960), economist and Nazi official convicted of war crimes in the Nuremberg Trials
 Walther Hahm (1894–1951), German World War II general
 Walther Hewel (1904–1945), German diplomat and one of Hitler's few personal friends
 Walther Kossel (1888–1956), German physicist
 Walther von Lüttwitz (1859–1942), German general and a leader of the unsuccessful Kapp-Lüttwitz Putsch against the Weimar Republic
 Walther Meissner (1882–1974), German technical physicist and discoverer of the Meissner effect
 Walther Müller (1905–1979), German physicist
 Walther Otto Müller (1833–1887), German botanist
 Walther Nehring (1892–1983), German World War II general
 Walther Nernst (1864–1941), German physical chemist and physicist; Nobel laureate in chemistry
 Walther Rathenau (1867–1922), German industrialist, politician, writer, statesman and Foreign Minister of Germany for the Weimar Republic
 Walther Ritz (1878–1909), Swiss theoretical physicist
 Walther Schroth (1882–1944), German World War II general
 Walther Schwieger (1885–1917), German World War I U-boat commander who sank the Lusitania
 Walther von Seydlitz-Kurzbach, German World War II general
 Walther Stampfli (1884–1965), Swiss politician
 Walther von der Vogelweide (c. 1170–c. 1230), High German lyric poet
 Walther Wenck (1900–1982), youngest general in the German Army during World War II
 Walther Wever (general) (1887–1936), German general, commander of the Luftwaffe and proponent of strategic bombing
 Walther Wever (pilot) (1923–1945), German flying ace and son of the above

Surname
 Andrea Walther (born 1970), German mathematician
 Augustin Friedrich Walther (1688–1746), German anatomist
 Bernhard Walther (1430–1504), German astronomer for whom a lunar crater is named
 C. F. W. Walther (1811–1887), German-American first President of the Lutheran Church–Missouri Synod and its most influential theologian
 Carl Walther (1858–1915), German gunsmith and founder of Walther Arms
 Christoph Walther (born 1950), German computer scientist
 Edgar Walther (1930-2013), Swiss chess player
 Eric Walther (born 1975), German pentathlete
 Erich Walther (1903–1947), German World War II general
 Frédéric Henri Walther (1761–1813), Alsatian-born general in Napoleon's army
 George Walther Sr. (1876–1961), American inventor
 George H. Walther (1828–1895), American politician
 Geraldine Walther (born 1950), American violist
 Gesine Walther (born 1962), German sprinter
 Johann Gottfried Walther (1684–1748), German organist and composer
 Johann Jakob Walther (composer) (1650–1704), German composer/violinist
 Johann Jakob Walther (1600–1679), German artist and botanical illustrator
 Johannes Walther (1860–1937), German geologist
 Kerstin Walther (born 1961), German sprinter
 Kirsten Walther  (1933–1987), Danish actress
 Philipp Franz von Walther (1782–1849), German doctor
 Christoph Theodosius Walther (1699–1741), German missionary

See also
 Walther (disambiguation)
 Walter (name)

German masculine given names
Surnames from given names